Franklin B. Mann (August 29, 1941 – 21 June 2022) was an American politician in the state of Florida.

Mann was born in Fort Myers, Florida. He served in the Florida House of Representatives from 1974 to 1982 for district 90. He served in the Florida Senate from 1982 to 1986 for district 38. He ran for Governor as a Democrat in 1986.  A "dark horse" candidate, Frank played on that moniker by traveling across the state riding a horse. He lost the nomination to State Representative Steve Pajcic, who in turn lost to Tampa Mayor Bob Martinez.

Mann would later serve on the Lee County Commission, representing East Lee County, where he focused on environmental issues and creating open spaces in his district.  He died on June 21, 2022, from pancreatic cancer.  A former mining site in Greenbriar Swamp purchased for conservation purposes, which Commissioner Mann  has been renamed the Frank Mann Preserve in his honor.

References

External links

|-

1941 births
2022 deaths
Democratic Party members of the Florida House of Representatives
People from Fort Myers, Florida